Havara is a type of chalky, powdery mixture of silt and limestone that is predominantly calcium carbonate in composition. It tends to form a surface coating of "limestone-marl areas". It is common in Cyprus, where it is used as gravel for roads. Soft and easily carved, it is widely used in construction throughout the Middle East. For example, it was used for the interior of the Gaziantep railway station. Havara is vulnerable to weathering.

References 

Chalk
Building stone
Gravel roads
Geology of Cyprus
Geology of Turkey